This is a list of civil parishes in the ceremonial county of Northamptonshire, England. There are 275 civil parishes.
Population figures are not available for some of the smallest parishes and those created after 2011.

See also
 List of civil parishes in England

References

External links
 Office for National Statistics : Geographical Area Listings
 East Northamptonshire Borough Council : Parish and Town Council Contacts
 Kettering Borough Council : Town and Parish Councils
 South Northamptonshire District Council : Parish and Town Councils
 Borough Council of Wellingborough : Parish Council Clerks

Civil parishes
Northamptonshire
 
Civil parishes